David Ippolito is an American singer-songwriter and playwright. He has self-released eight albums and is best known for his weekly summer performances in Central Park.

Career 
In 1992, Ippolito first performed an impromptu concert on a hill in Central Park in front of a small audience. Among those present was editor Jack Rosenthal from The New York Times, who the next day published an editorial about the performance. The next week, Ippolito played again, and began to gather a following. Since then, he has performed on a hill near a rowboat lake almost every summer weekend to crowds of passers-by and regulars, including international tourists, and has become a cult figure in New York.

His most recent CD, "Wouldn't Want It Any Other Way", was released in 2009. The album features "Keep Hope Alive", which was co-written with Sid Bernstein, the famous music promoter who brought the Beatles to the US. Ippolito has performed at venues throughout New York City, including an annual December performance at Merkin Concert Hall, as well as shows at the Leonard Nimoy Thalia, Symphony Space, The Red Lion on Bleecker Street, and Cast Party at the Birdland Music Club.

Central Park
Ippolito's Central Park concerts are relatively well-known. However, in 2000, the Parks Department ordered him (and all other musicians in the park) to unplug his small speaker, which led to outcry from his fans and letters to The New York Times by supportive audience members. The current arrangement is that he has to select a month in advance which dates he wants to play, as well as pay for each permit, rain or shine. On the Sunday after the September 11 attacks, approximately 1,000 of his fans filled his guitar case in Central Park with more than $7,000, which Ippolito, the son of a retired New York City firefighter, delivered to Ladder Company 25 and the 9/11 Fund.

I Love the Company
During 2006, Ippolito hosted a daily podcast called "I Love the Company," which was broadcast globally via Podshow.com. The 365+ podcasts featured new works by Ippolito and music by singers and songwriters around the world, which was joined by an "I Love the Video" videocast.

Playwriting and other work 
As an actor, Ippolito has had roles in national TV commercials and musical theater productions. 
Ippolito's song, "City Song," was used to close NBC's television coverage of the 2001 New York City Marathon. 
He has appeared on ABC's "Who Wants to be a Millionaire", winning $64,000.
A playwright and storyteller, his work has been performed at The Soho Playhouse and The Actors Studio. Ippolito is currently workshopping his new musical project for the stage, "Possibility Junkie."

Discography 
 The People on the Hill (1997)
 That Guitar Man from Central Park...In Person (1998)
 Just a Thought for Christmas (1999)
 It's Just Us (2000)
 Crazy on the Same Day (2002)
 Talk Louder (the Cell Phone Song) (2003)
 Common Ground (2004)
 I Love the Company (2007)
 Crazy on the Same Day (re-mastered in 2008)
 Wouldn't Want It Any Other Way (2009)

References

External links

 That Guitar Man Website
 Description of his charity work
 Interview
 I Love The Company podcast
 YouTube "Resolution (The Torture Song)"
 New York Times: A Protest Song Gets a Television Showcase
 Television Documentary Film: Following Dreams

Living people
American folk singers
American folk guitarists
American male guitarists
American male singer-songwriters
Central Park
American rock guitarists
American rock singers
American rock songwriters
American people of Italian descent
American street performers
American performance artists
Guitarists from New York City
Singers from New York City
Place of birth missing (living people)
Year of birth missing (living people)
Singer-songwriters from New York (state)